Terry Magaoa Chapman  ( – 2 January 2014) was a Niuean administrator known for his work in advocating the self-governance of Niue.

Biography
Chapman was born in the village of Hakupu on Niue, and studied at Victoria University of Wellington in New Zealand, where he was awarded a Diploma in Public Administration. He was a leading architect, with Robert Rex and Young Vivian, of the modern Niue and in the formulation of its Constitution, creating a pathway for the island to become self-governing on 19 October 1974, which followed a visit from the United Nations Decolonisation Committee to Niue.

Chapman wrote a book, The Decolonisation of Niue, published in 1976. He was appointed a Member of the Order of the British Empire in the 1987 New Year Honours, in recognition for his services as Secretary to the Government of Niue.

Death
Chapman died in Hamilton, New Zealand, where he had lived since 2006, on 2 January 2014, aged 69, and was survived by his wife, Fakaofomatua Pepese Chapman, and their children.

Works

References

1940s births
2014 deaths
Year of birth missing
Niuean politicians
Niuean diplomats
Members of the Order of the British Empire
Victoria University of Wellington alumni